The LNWR 18-inch Tank class was a class of 80 0-6-2T locomotives built by the London and North Western Railway in their Crewe Works between 1898 and 1902.

They were also known officially as the 5 ft 3in Tank Class or unofficially as the Watford Tank Class.

Design
The design featured a boiler pressed to  delivering saturated steam to two  cylinders connected by Joy valve gear to the driving wheels.

The "5ft 3in" in the title referred to the diameter of the driving wheels (usually the stated dimension was for the wheel centres) but which were actually .

They were a tank engine version of the LNWR Cauliflower Class, built from 1892.

Service

They were built as mixed traffic locomotives, and were frequently used on suburban services. Their use on Euston to Watford suburban trains gave rise to the nickname "Watford Tanks".

The first locomotive was withdrawn in 1920. By the time of the 1923 Grouping, 77 were still in service and passed to the London, Midland and Scottish Railway who gave them power classification 1P, and renumbered them 6860 to 6939. Fifteen were still in service at nationalisation in 1948, but only two survived to receive their British Railways' number.

None were preserved.

References 

London and North Western Railway locomotives
0-6-2T locomotives
Railway locomotives introduced in 1898
Scrapped locomotives